Nakilabad (also Romanized as Nakīlābād; also known as Takmīlābād) is a village in Haram Rud-e Olya Rural District, in the Central District of Malayer County, Hamadan Province, Iran. At the 2006 census, its population was 71, in 17 families.

References 

Populated places in Malayer County